"I'll Kiss It Away" is a song by German recording artist Sarah Connor. A dedication to Connor's daughter Summer, her second child with American pop singer Marc Terenzi, it was written by Connor along with frequent collaborators, Rob Tyger and Kay Denar, for her sixth studio album, Sexy as Hell (2008), with production helmed by the latter. Musically, "I'll Kiss It Away" is  a mid-tempo pop ballad with contemporary R&B influences that combines classic chord progression on an acoustic guitar with a modern-sounding 808 drum beat. The song samples US Billboard Hot 100 top ten hit Tattoo by R&B singer Jordin Sparks.

Released as the album's second single on 7 November 2008 in German-speaking Europe, the song peaked at number twenty-one in Germany, where it became Connor's first single to miss the top twenty since 2001's "French Kissing". It also fared poorly in Austria and Switzerland.

Track listing

Charts

Weekly charts

References

External links

Songs about kissing
2008 singles
Sarah Connor (singer) songs
Songs written by Kay Denar
Songs written by Rob Tyger
X-Cell Records singles
2008 songs
Songs written by Sarah Connor (singer)